Shahrak-e Kushka (also Romanized as Shahrak-e Kūshkā; also known as Kūshk) is a village in Bazoft-e Bala Rural District of Bazoft District, Kuhrang County, Chaharmahal and Bakhtiari province, Iran. At the 2006 census, its population was 282 in 43 households. The following census in 2011 counted 418 people in 86 households. The latest census in 2016 showed a population of 528 people in 130 households; it was the largest village in its rural district. The village is populated by Lurs.

References 

Kuhrang County

Populated places in Chaharmahal and Bakhtiari Province

Populated places in Kuhrang County

Luri settlements in Chaharmahal and Bakhtiari Province